Gonzalo Ramos may refer to:

 Gonzalo Ramos (actor) (born 1989), Spanish actor
 Gonzalo Ramos (footballer) (born 1991), Uruguayan footballer